Daly is an Irish surname, derived from the Gaelic Ó Dálaigh. Notable people with the surname include:

Entertainment and arts

Andy Daly (born 1971), American actor, writer, and comedian
Augustin Daly (1838–1899), American theatrical manager and playwright
Candice Daly (1963–2004), American actress
Carson Daly, television personality
Dan Daly (1864–1904), American comic actor 
Eileen Daly, English actress and singer
Gary Daly, English songwriter and vocalist
James Daly (actor) (1918–1978), American actor
Joel Daly (1934–2020), American news anchor and journalist
John Charles Daly (1914–1991), American journalist game show host and radio personality
Mark Daly, British actor
Mike Daly, American alt-country and rock and roll singer/songwriter
Norman Daly (1911-2008), American artist
Peter-Hugo Daly, actor and drummer
Richard Daly (1758–1813), Irish actor and theatre manager
Scott Daly (born 1994), American football player
Tess Daly (born 1969), English television presenter
Tim Daly, American theatre, screen and voice actor, director and producer
Tyne Daly, American actress
William Merrigan Daly (1887–1936), known as "Bill Daly", Broadway songwriter and conductor

Sports
Aidan Daly, New Zealand basketball player
Aisling Daly (born 1987), Irish mixed martial arts fighter
Anthony Daly (hurler), Irish
Bill Daly, Canadian deputy commissioner of hockey
Charles Dudley Daly, West Point coach, founder of AFCA
Chuck Daly (1930–2009), American basketball head coach
Derek Daly, Irish racing driver
Elliot Daly, (born 1992), English rugby player
Fred Daly (golfer) (1911–1990), Northern Irish golfer
Gerry Daly, Irish football player
Jason Daly, Westmeath Gaelic footballer
Joe Daly (footballer), English footballer
John Daly (athlete), Irish steeplechase athlete
John Daly (golfer), professional golfer
Jon Daly (footballer), Irish association football player
Keevil Daly, (1923–2011), Guyanese-Canadian weightlifter
Matt Daly,(born 1989) Scottish Professional Wrestler 
Matt Daley (born 1983), English field hockey player
Matty Daly (born 2001), English footballer player
Rachel Daly (born 1991), English association football player
Robert Daly, Irish sprinter
Tom Daly (1891–1946), Canadian baseball player
Wes Daly, English football player

Politics and government
Anthony Daly, Irish agrarian agitator
Brendan Daly (politician) (born 1940), Irish Fianna Fáil Party politician
Chris Daly, American politician, San Francisco, California
Clare Daly, Irish socialist politician and trade union activist
Denis Daly (1747–1792), Irish landowner and politician
Dominick Daly (1798–1868), British Governor of Prince Edward Island, Tobago and South Australia
Edward Daly (Irish revolutionary) (1891–1916), Irish nationalist
Edward Daly (mayor) (1926–1993), councillor and mayor of Newham, London
Fred Daly (politician) (1913–1995), Australian Labor Party politician
James Daly (activist) (1838-1910) Irish nationalist activist
James Daly, 1st Baron Dunsandle and Clanconal (1782–1847), Irish baron and politician
J. Burrwood Daly (1872–1939), US congressman
John Daly (Fenian) (1845-1916), Irish nationalist
John Corry Wilson Daly (1796–1878), Canadian politician, businessperson and militia officer
John Lawrence Daly (1943–2004), self-declared "greenhouse skeptic"
Lawrence Joseph Sarsfield Daly (1912–1979), fringe American politician
Malachy Bowes Daly (1836–1920), Canadian politician
Margaret Daly, served in the European Parliament
Mark Daly (born 1973), Irish politician
Teresa Daly, American politician
Thomas Mayne Daly Sr. (1827–1885), Canadian businessman and political figure
Thomas Mayne Daly (1852–1911), Canadian politician
William Davis Daly (1851–1900), American Democratic Party politician who represented New Jersey
Will H. Daly (1869–1924), American labor leader, progressive politician and businessman

Journalism and literature
 Brian Daly, Irish news journalist
 James Daly (journalist), American journalist in San Francisco
 John Daly (journalist), American newspaper and television journalist
 Maureen Daly (1921–2006), American novelist
 Wally K. Daly, English writer for television and radio

Academics and science
 Herman Daly, ecological economist and professor
 Marie Maynard Daly, first black female in the US to earn a Ph.D. in chemistry
 Martin Daly, Canadian psychology professor
 Mary Daly (sociologist), Irish sociologist and academic
 Mary E. Daly, Irish historian 
 Reginald Aldworth Daly (1871–1957), Canadian geologist
 Richard Daly, known for the Daly detector, a type of mass spectrometry detector

Religion
 Cahal Daly (1917–2009), Irish Cardinal Archbishop of Armagh
 Edward Daly (bishop) (1933–2016), Irish religious leader
 Edward Celestin Daly (1894–1964), Roman Catholic Bishop of Des Moines, Iowa, 1948–1964
 James Joseph Daly (1921–2013), American Roman Catholic bishop
 Mary Daly, radical feminist and theologian

Other
 Bernard Daly (1858–1920), Pioneer doctor and Oregon politician
 Charlie Daly (1896-1923) executed Irish Republican
 Daniel Daly (1873–1937), US Marine, Double Medal of Honor recipient
 Ed Daly, US entrepreneur behind World Airways
 Edward C. Daly (1914–1941), United States Navy sailor
 Edward M. Daly, U.S. Army General
 Henry Daly (1823–1895), British Army officer
 James Daly (mutineer), British Army mutineer
 John Daly (outlaw) (1839–1864), American western outlaw
 John Donald Daly (1840–1923), California businessman and landowner
 Marcus Daly (1841–1900), Irish-born American copper-mining businessman
 Paddy Daly, soldier in the Irish Republican Army
 Seamus Daly, Irish Republican
 Thomas Aquinas Daly, American contemporary landscape and still-life painter

See also
 Ó Dálaigh, history of the name

English-language surnames
Anglicised Irish-language surnames
Surnames of Irish origin